Sancar is a village in the Yeşilli District of Mardin Province in Turkey. The village is populated by Kurds of the Omerkan tribe and had a population of 308 in 2021.

References 

Villages in Yeşilli District
Kurdish settlements in Mardin Province